HMCS Chaleur was a  that served in the Royal Canadian Navy for three and a half months in 1954 before being sold to the French Navy to become La Dieppoise. The ship was named for Chaleur Bay, located between Quebec and New Brunswick. Her name was given to her replacement, . As La Dieppoise, the vessel served as a coastal patrol vessel in the France's Pacific Ocean territories. The ship was taken out of service in 1987.

Design
The Bay class were designed and ordered as replacements for the Second World War-era minesweepers that the Royal Canadian Navy operated at the time.

They had a complement of 38 officers and ratings.

The Bay-class minesweepers were powered by two GM 12-cylinder diesel engines driving two shafts creating . The ships were armed with one Bofors 40 mm gun and were equipped with minesweeping gear.

Service history
Chaleur was laid down on 8 June 1951 by Port Arthur Shipbuilding at Port Arthur, Ontario with the yard number 107 and launched 21 June 1952. The vessel was commissioned into the Royal Canadian Navy on 18 June 1954 with the hull identification number 144.

Following commissioning, Chaleur spent three months in service with the Royal Canadian Navy. The minesweeper was paid off on 30 September 1954. She was transferred to France on 9 October 1954. The minesweeper was commissioned on 13 November 1954 and renamed La Dieppoise. She served as a minesweeper until 1973 when the minesweeping gear was removed and she transferred to the Pacific for duty as an overseas territories patrol vessel. She was paid off 9 July 1987 and stricken later that year.

References

Notes

Citations

Sources
 
 
 
 
 

 

Bay-class minesweepers
Ships built in Ontario
1952 ships
Cold War minesweepers of Canada
Bay-class minesweepers of the French Navy
Cold War minesweepers of France
Minesweepers of the Royal Canadian Navy